This list contains all games published by Focus Entertainment.

List of games

References 

 
Video game lists by company